Capital punishment was used from the creation of the modern Serbian state in 1804. On 26 February 2002, the Serbian Parliament adopted amendments striking the death penalty from the Criminal Code. The last execution, by shooting, took place on 14 February 1992, and the last death sentences were pronounced in 2001. Serbia is bound by the following international conventions prohibiting capital punishment (dates of ratification are given in parentheses): The Second Optional Protocol to the International Covenant on Civil and Political Rights (6 September 2001), and Protocols No. 6 and No. 13 to the European Convention on Human Rights (3 March 2004). According to Article 24 of the Serbian constitution (2006): „Human life is inviolable. There shall be no death penalty in the Republic of Serbia“.

History

Serbia, 1804–1914

In the first decades of the 19th century, the death penalty was widely used in Serbia for a variety of offenses: murder, theft, political crimes, infanticide and even for extramarital sexual relations.

Until 1858, different modes of execution were in use: shooting, hanging, breaking on the wheel, „lethal gauntlet“ (a double file of men facing each other and armed with birch rods with which to strike at a person who is made to run between them) and decapitation; in the very beginning, there were a few instances of impalement. Until 1842, murderers were subject to „mirror“ punishments, meaning that a murderer was to be killed in an identical manner in which he killed the victim (often with the same weapon). In addition, the bodies of executed offenders were almost always publicly displayed on wheels and kept there for a set period of time or until „complete decay“. In 1858, shooting became the only legal mode of execution, while the practice of displaying the bodies was discontinued.

Under the first Serbian Penal Code, passed in 1860, the death sentences were to be executed in public, by shooting, while the executed body was to be buried immediately at the place of execution. The Code included sixteen capital offenses: various forms of murder and robbery leading to death, as well as treason.   In 1863, however, the death penalty was re-introduced for theft and certain other crimes.   The death penalty for theft was finally abolished only in 1902. In 1905, executions in Belgrade ceased to be public (the offenders were shot furtively in places not frequented by public), but they remained public (until 1930) in other towns and in the country, where thousands of spectators gathered for the spectacle.

Regular statistics on capital punishment began to be kept in 1889. Before that, reliable data exist for some years only. For example, in 1844 there were 62 death sentences (and 50 executions), in 1857 – 87 (10), 1868 – 64 (36) and in 1887 – 34 (23). In 1883, the year of a massive rebellion against the government (Timočka buna), 117 persons (mostly rebels) were sentenced to death and 47 executed. According to the official statistics, in the 25 years from 1889 to 1914 there were 600 death sentences and 344 executions.

Yugoslavia, 1918–1941

When Yugoslavia was created in 1918, different legal systems remained in force in different parts of the new country. In the north-western provinces (Bosnia and Herzegovina, Croatia, Slovenia and Vojvodina), executions were by hanging in an enclosed space with restricted public attendance. In the remainder of the country (Serbia, Kosovo, Montenegro and Macedonia), executions were by shooting and in public. When a single Penal Code was introduced for the whole country (1929), hanging remained the only legal mode of execution, with the exception of sentences passed by military courts, which were executed by shooting.

Crimes punished by death were mostly murder and robbery leading to death, as well as terrorism. The terrorists sentenced to death were mainly the communists and the Croatian, Macedonian and Albanian separatists.

According to the official statistics, there were 459 death sentences and 232 executions in Serbia from 1920 to 1940 (on average, 22 sentences and 11 executions per year). In the same period, in the whole of Yugoslavia there were 904 sentences and 291 executions (43 and 14 per year).

Hangings were performed by state executioners: Alois Seyfried (1918-1922), Florian Mausner (1922-1928) and Karlo Dragutin Hart (1928-1941).

Yugoslavia, 1945–1991

In the first years after World War II, death sentences were passed in large numbers daily on collaborationists and war criminals, but also on the „enemies of the people“, i.e. all those who opposed the new communist regime. There are no reliable data, but it seems likely that in Yugoslavia until 1951 there were as many as 10,000 death sentences, a majority of which were executed. In the same period, there must have been several thousands of death sentences and executions in Serbia. In addition to political offenses, capital crimes included the theft of the government property, as well as aggravated murder and robbery. Until 1959, executions were either by shooting or by hanging, as determined by the sentence of the court in each individual case, although hangings were considered as an aggravated form and were used less frequently. In the first post-war years, executions of major war criminals were often public. After 1950, the number of death sentences fell sharply. According to the official statistics, from 1950 to 1958 there were 229 death sentences in Yugoslavia (ca. 29 p.a.) and 122 in Serbia (ca. 15 p.a.). No official data were published on executions, but it is safe to assume that about two thirds of all death sentences were executed.

The 1959 reforms resulted in a less strict system of criminal justice. Number of capital offenses was reduced and capital punishment was abolished for property offenses. Hanging was abolished and the only legal mode of execution remained shooting, performed by a platoon of eight policemen, only half of whom had rifles loaded with live ammunition. Executions could not be performed publicly. From 1959 to 1991, there were, on average, two or three executions per year in Yugoslavia and about two in Serbia (over 70% of all death sentences in Yugoslavia were passed by courts in Serbia).

Serbia after 1991

From April 1992, Serbia was a part of the Federal Republic of Yugoslavia, which consisted of two federal units – Serbia and Montenegro. From 1991 to 2002, Serbian courts passed 19 death sentences, none of which had been executed. On 14 February 1992, Johan Drozdek was executed in Sombor. He was sentenced to death in 1988 for rape and murder of a six-year-old girl.

Abolition

Early attempts

In 1826, poet Sima Milutinović Sarajlija (1791–1847) wrote to Prince Miloš Obrenović, advising him to abolish the death penalty. The Prince never received the letter and nothing came out of the poet’s project. During the drafting of the Penal Code in 1858, a law professor and a judge Jovan Filipović (1819–1876) proposed an abolition of capital punishment, arguing that it was unconstitutional under the then Serbian constitution. His proposal was rejected by a majority vote in the Drafting Committee. In January 1881, deputies of the People's Radical Party made two motions to completely abolish the death penalty in the Serbian Parliament, but both were rejected by a majority vote. A similar motion, although restricted to an abolition for political crimes only, was made in the Parliament in 1887 and was also rejected. A committee appointed to draft a new constitution for Serbia in 1888 held a debate on the death penalty, but the motion to abolish it was rejected. Another parliamentary debate was held in 1906, with the same result. Among those who spoke against capital punishment was the then minister of justice, Milenko Vesnić.

In the parliamentary debates on the draft constitution for the newly created Yugoslavia in 1921, the leftist parties (Communists and Republicans), as well as several smaller parties from Slovenia and Croatia, called for an abolition of the death penalty, but the majority decided to keep it in the constitution. In 1926, women’s organizations in Yugoslavia, headed by the Popular Union of Women (Narodni ženski savez), demanded abolition of capital punishment "for women as well as for men".

Marxists scholars, gathered around the Praxis journal, proposed an abolition of the death penalty in 1963. In 1980, a Belgrade lawyer Srđa M. Popović submitted a petition to the Yugoslav authorities to abolish the death penalty. A Society Against the Death Penalty was founded in Belgrade in 1981, but the authorities refused to allow it. In 1983, more than a thousand Yugoslav citizens, mostly from Slovenia, signed a petition to the federal parliament calling for an abolition of capital punishment.

Partial abolition, 1992

Constitution of FR Yugoslavia (which consisted of Serbia and Montenegro), adopted on 25 April 1992, abolished capital punishment for federal crimes (including genocide, war crimes, political and military offenses), but the federal units kept the right to prescribe capital punishment for crimes under their jurisdiction (murder and robbery).

Final abolition, 2002

On 26 February 2002, the Serbian parliament amended Serbia's Penal Code by deleting from it all references to capital punishment. As was stressed in the parliamentary debate, a paramount motive for this abolition was the intention of the then FR Yugoslavia to join the Council of Europe. At the time of the abolition, there were 12 people in Serbia under the sentence of death. Their sentence was commuted to 40 years in prison.

In 2006, new Constitution of Serbia was adopted. Article 24 of the Constitution explicitly forbids enactment of capital punishment.

Public opinion

In the Fall of 2001, shortly before the Serbian abolition, a study of attitudes to the death penalty, based on a poll of 926 citizens, found the respondents to be equally divided: 43% were for the death penalty and 43% were against it, with 14% undecided.   Subsequent polls, taken every year since 2007 on a representative sample of around 1,000 citizens, confirm this result. Those for and those against capital punishment remain equally divided with minor year-to-year variations, like a seesaw: one year a majority of a few per cent would be for, and the next against the death penalty (see Table below).

This has changed since 2012 where every year a majority support the death penalty.

Executions since 1959
Source: SPSK Database

References

External links
www.deathpenalty.rs	Serbia against Capital Punishment, a site devoted exclusively to the death penalty in Serbia and the former Yugoslavia
 

Law of Serbia
Serbia
Death in Serbia
Human rights abuses in Serbia
2002 disestablishments in Serbia